Ranvijay  Singh Singha is an Indian actor, television personality and VJ. Ranvijay is known for his appearance in MTV Roadies, where he won the show. He was a part of the show from 2004 to 2020, earlier as a gang leader and then as a host. He also appeared in judging panel for auditions from 8: Shortcut to Hell to 18: Roadies Revolution. He made his Bollywood debut in Toss: A Flip of Destiny (2009). Ranvijay has also acted in London Dreams (2009) and Action Replayy (2010). Singha made his Punjabi movie debut in 2011, starring in Jimmy Shergill's Dharti.

Early life
Singha's father, Iqbal Singh Singha is retired Lt. General of Indian Army and his mother Baljeet Kaur is a housewife, although his father is retired but is currently posted in Syria as the UN Force Commander, his mother is a poet in her own right. Owing to his father's transferable jobs across India, he went to nine different schools, and finally graduated from Army Public School, Dhaula Kuan, New Delhi, he's a grad from Hansraj College (University of Delhi doing B. Com hons). He wanted to win the Hero Honda Karizma R. Singh used to work for a construction worker in New Jersey, United States. His younger brother Harman Singha is also an actor, VJ and television personality.

Personal life 
Singha is the only exception in his family to not serve in Indian military as his family is serving Indian military since six generations. Rannvijay married Priyanka Vohra on 10 April 2014. The couple has a daughter named Kainaat who was born on 17 January 2017. Rannvijay is a comics superhero and bikes fan and is known for collecting Wolverine and Batman merchandises, he owns Suzuki GSX-R600, Kawasaki Ninja, Hero Honda Karizma R and Royal Enfield. He is a Warriors fan. On 4 March 2021, Singha and his wife Priyanka announced that they are expecting their second child.

Career

MTV India
Singha appeared in first season of MTV Roadies and further hosting all the season from 2.0 to Roadies Revolution. He has also hosted other MTV shows, MTV Stuntmania, MTV Force India The Fast and The Gorgeous, MTV Splitsvilla, MTV Scooty Pep Diva and MTV Troll Police. He took an exit from the MTV Roadies.

Film career
Rannvijay made his Bollywood debut in Toss: A Flip of Destiny in 2009. He then acted in London Dreams along with Ajay Devgn and Salman Khan. He further appeared in Action Replayy in 2011. He made his Punjabi cinema debut in 2011, starring in Jimmy Shergill's Dharti. He also acted in a horror film "3 AM".

Filmography

Films

Television

Web series

References

External links

 
 
 

1983 births
Living people
Male actors from Punjab, India
MTV Roadies
21st-century Indian male actors
Male actors in Punjabi cinema
Indian VJs (media personalities)
Indian game show hosts